Gençlik Parkı (literally Youth Park) is a public park in Ankara, Turkey.

Geography 

The  park is almost at the center of Ankara. It is surrounded by Ulus Square to the north, the Ankara Opera House (formerly Ankara Exhibition Building) to the east, Selim Sırrı Tarcan Sport Hall and Ankara Central Station to the south and, 19 Mayıs Stadium to the west.

History 
During the early years of the Turkish Republic, the place where the park is located was a marshland. After the marshes were drained, the park was established and opened to the public on 19 May 1943, the National Youth Day. There were coffee houses around the  main pool, a swimming pool, a luna park, an open-air theatre and tracks.  In 1957, two miniature trains were established within the park area as a part of the amusement attractions.

The park in the 2000s 
After restoration and renovation works, there are now a cultural center, youths' center and Ankara Municipality Convention Hall as well as 43 kiosks in the park. During nights light performances are held in the main pool. Also a science museum is under construction.

References 

Parks in Ankara
Urban public parks
1943 establishments in Turkey